Accommodation (or condescension) is the theological principle that God, while being in His nature unknowable and unreachable, has nevertheless communicated with humanity in a way that humans can understand and to which they can respond. The concept is that scripture has accommodated, or made allowance for, the original audience's language and general level of understanding. Often included in these ideas is the notion of human sinfulness or capacity; so in other words God accommodates himself to the human capacities of those to whom biblical revelation is given.

History 
The history of the concept of accommodation reaches back to ancient Jewish biblical interpretation. It was taken up and developed by Christian theologians like Origen and Augustine, which ensured its continuance into the work of medieval biblical exegetes. Erasmus of Rotterdam employed it as did numerous Reformation theologians, both Roman Catholic and Protestant. The sixteenth-century Protestant Reformer John Calvin is a key developer of the concept, though contemporaries from Martin Luther to Ulrich Zwingli, Peter Martyr Vermigli and numerous others used it.

There has been scholarly debate about John Calvin's use of the concept of accommodation which continues to the present day. Scholars like E. David Willis and Ford Lewis Battles, and more recently Arnold Huijgen, have argued that Calvin developed the idea from sources related to classical rhetoric while others such as David F. Wright and Jon Balserak have argued that Calvin's usage of the idea of divine accommodation is too diffuse to fit into any concept (such as decorum) associated with rhetoric. None of these scholars are disputing Calvin's credentials as a Renaissance humanist but rather whether they explain his appreciation and use of divine accommodation. Both groups acknowledge Calvin's indebtedness to the Church Fathers from whom he appropriated the motif, or cluster of motifs, of divine accommodation.

The Bible
Biblical accommodation refers to a number of distinct views in Biblical exegesis, or the interpretation of the Bible. Such views broadly concern the question of whether, or to what extent, the Bible may be said to be literally true. One view, associated with John Calvin, holds that while some of the expressions and metaphors used in the Bible may be literally false, they are nonetheless essentially true. Another view, associated with Faustus Socinus, holds that some Biblical language is both literally and essentially false.

The concept of Biblical accommodation is related to the broader concept of accommodation or condescension, which Benin describes as the view that 'divine revelation is adjusted to the disparate intellectual and spiritual level of humanity at different times in history'.

Language 
Human language introduces a further complication into the notion of Biblical accommodation. Church tradition (including more recent statements of faith like the Chicago Statement on Biblical Inerrancy and the Cambridge Declaration) holds to the belief that only the original Hebrew Old Testament text and the original Greek New Testament text can be clearly identified as God's word. Therefore, any human translation of the original language will automatically not be considered God's inspired word – which naturally includes the 5th century Latin Vulgate, as well as today's more contemporary translations.

Yet accommodation allows for the belief that despite this natural linguistic barrier, God still has the power to use such translations in order to reveal his nature to people. This implies that Christians do not have to learn Ancient Hebrew and Greek in order to hear what God has to say.

Traditional Christian theology asserts that it is through the work of the Holy Spirit within the individual that God the Father is able to communicate to them via the words of the Bible.

Theological approaches to Biblical accommodation 
In his discussion of accommodation, Thomas Hartwell Horne, the English theologian, distinguishes between the 'form' and 'essence' of revelation. The former refers to the manner in which the Biblical text expresses its content; the latter, to the content which is expressed through the Biblical text. Thus, there are two possible kinds of Biblical accommodation: one which holds that merely the expressive form of the Bible is modified to accord with human capacities; and a stronger version, which holds that the content of the Bible is modified to conform with human perceptions of divine reality, to the extent that it may be literally false.

Lee, a contemporary scholar, adopts a similar distinction. He associates John Calvin with the 'formal' view, and Faustus Socinus with the 'essential' view. According to Lee, Calvin held that, although a number of the descriptions of events (in particular, those in the Genesis creation narrative) could not be literally true according to current scientific theories, they were nonetheless essentially true and had simply been accommodated to human perceptual capacities. By contrast, Socinus held that some 'accommodated' Biblical teachings in the Bible were literally false.

Another view, expressed in an early 20th century edition of the Catholic Encyclopedia, holds that 'accommodation' is the adaptation of words or sentences from the Bible to signify ideas different from those that are genuinely expressed in the text.

Biblical accommodation in liturgy
Accommodation is used in the liturgy and by the Fathers of the Church; texts have been accommodated by preachers and ascetical authors.  Many of the sermons of St. Bernard are mosaics of scripture phrases.  The Council of Trent  forbade the wresting of Scripture to profane uses (Sess. IV, Decret. "De editione et usu Sacrorum Librorum ").  Typical rules for guidance in the accommodation of scripture are:

 Accommodated texts should never be used as arguments drawn from revelation.
 Accommodation should not be farfetched.
 Accommodations should be reverent.

Biblical accommodation in apologetics
German eighteenth-century rationalism held that the Biblical writers made great use of conscious accommodation, intending moral commonplaces when they seemed to be enunciating Christian dogmas.  Another expression for this, used, for example, by Johann Salomo Semler, is "economy," which also occurs in the kindred sense of "reserve" (or of Disciplina Arcani, a modern term for the supposed early Catholic habit of reserving esoteric truths). Isaac Williams on Reserve in Religious Teaching, No. 80 of Tracts for the Times, made a great sensation, and was commented on by Richard William Church in The Oxford Movement.

Jesus
The belief that God has been able to sufficiently communicate to humanity, despite the failings and limitations of the latter, is given its supreme form in the person and work of Jesus Christ. Traditional Christianity, as expressed in the historic creeds, proclaims the Trinity as being part of the orthodox Christian faith. The divinity of Christ, who is believed to be fully man and yet fully God, shows how the Godhead has accommodated itself to human minds and experience. Many Christians, especially those from a Reformed background, see in the person and work of Christ not only the supreme form of accommodation, but the centre and reason for it as well.

By becoming human, Jesus Christ accommodates himself to the human condition. Through his life, his teaching and ministry, Christ can be considered as literally God speaking and communicating sufficiently to humanity – not via the abilities and strength of human beings, but via the ability and strength of God. In this sense, man is fully passive and God is fully active – it is not man who "discovers" Christ, but Christ who reveals himself to man.

While many Christians debate the meaning of Christ's death and resurrection, Christians who proclaim a substitution-based theology of atonement believe that Jesus died on the cross for the sins of the world as an atoning sin-substitute, and that his resurrection from the dead brings new life to all who have faith in him. This message, common in evangelical churches, is also considered as a form of accommodation when it is proclaimed publicly.

The sacraments
In most Protestant churches, only two sacraments are recognised, Baptism and The Lord's Supper. Both have a special significance in that they were symbolic representations instituted by Jesus. In these sacraments, God is held by Christians to accommodate himself and his gospel in the sacramental actions to sinful and limited human beings.

Preaching of the Gospel

Gospel preaching is one of the most important facets of the principle of accommodation, for in it humankind is held to experience God's redemptive power through the work of the Spirit. Through this monergistic activity, God is believed to effectively cause people to come to faith.

See also
 Biblical inerrancy
 John Calvin's view of Scripture
 Hermeneutics

References

Sources

God in Christianity
Christian terminology
Christian theology of the Bible